Andrea Hernández may refer to:

 Andrea Confesora Hernández (born 1967), Dominican judoka
  (born 1982), Mexican politician
 Andrea Hernández (footballer) (born 1998), Mexican player for C.F. Monterrey
 Andrea Hernández (taekwondo), Bolivian competitor at the 2017 World Taekwondo Championships – Women's bantamweight